Abdul Aziz Khan (dates unknown) was an Indian first-class cricketer active 1912–1926 who played mostly for the Muslims cricket team. He made eleven appearances, scoring 185 runs with a highest score of 43, and took 18 wickets with a best innings return of five for 79.

References

Date of birth unknown
Date of death unknown
Indian cricketers
Muslims cricketers